Aechmea warasii is a plant species in the genus Aechmea. This species is endemic to the State of Espírito Santo in eastern Brazil.

Cultivars
Aechmea 'Angulation'
 Aechmea 'Greg Schol'

References

warasii
Endemic flora of Brazil
Plants described in 1972